The 20905 / 20906 Ekta Nagar–Rewa Mahamana Express is a Superfast train belonging to Western Railway zone that runs between  and  in India.

It is currently being operated with 20905/20906 train numbers on a weekly basis.

Coach composition

The train has LHB rakes with max speed of 110 kmph. The train consists of 20 coaches:

 1 First AC
 2 AC II Tier
 2 AC III Tier
 8 Sleeper coaches
 1 Pantry car
 4 General Unreserved
 2 EOG cum Luggage Rake

Service

20905/Ekta Nagar – Rewa Mahamana Express has an average speed of 60 km/hr and covers 1339 km in 22 hrs 20 mins.

20906/Rewa – Ekta Nagar Mahamana Express has an average speed of 65 km/hr and covers 1339 km in 20 hrs 45 mins.

Route and halts 

The important halts of the train are:

Traction

Both trains are hauled by a Vadodara Loco Shed-based WAP-7 (HOG)-equipped locomotive from Ekta Nagar to Rewa and vice versa.

Rake sharing

The train shares its rake with 20903/20904 Ekta Nagar–Varanasi Mahamana Express.

See also 

 Ekta Nagar railway station
 Rewa railway station
 Mahamana Express

Notes

References 

Rail transport in Gujarat
Rail transport in Madhya Pradesh
Rail transport in Maharashtra
Transport in Vadodara
Transport in Rewa, Madhya Pradesh
Mahamana Express trains
Memorials to Madan Mohan Malaviya
Railway services introduced in 2019